Kapıkule station, is the westernmost railway station in Turkey. It is located towards the north of Kapıkule, the frontier town on the Turkey/Bulgaria border. Kapıkule is a border station and the terminus for domestic trains in European Turkey. Only the Bosphorus Express to Bucharest and the Balkan Express to Belgrade continue across the border into Bulgaria. The station is the busier of the 2 operational border stations of the Turkish State Railways in Turkey, the other one being Kapıköy on the border with Iran.

Kapıkule station was opened in 1971 as part of the Edirne cut-off to bypass the main line of the former Oriental Railways in the Ottoman Empire. The construction of this line, however, resulted in the abandonment of Edirne's historic Karaağaç railway station, which became first the Rectorate (1998–2011) and later the Faculty of Fine Arts building of Trakya University.

External links 

Railway stations in Edirne Province
Railway stations opened in 1971
1971 establishments in Turkey